Greed Killing is an EP by the British band Napalm Death.

It was released in 1995 on Earache Records, containing two songs from the Diatribes album and four exclusive songs from the Diatribes recording sessions.

Track listing

Credits
Mark "Barney" Greenway – vocals
Jesse Pintado – lead guitar
Mitch Harris – rhythm guitar
Shane Embury – bass
Danny Herrera – drums

References

1995 EPs
Napalm Death EPs
Earache Records EPs